The Midwest Universities Consortium for International Activities, Inc. (MUCIA) is a Midwestern United States consortium of 10 Big Ten public research universities that collaborates on large-scale projects in developing countries. MUCIA was established in 1964 with support from the Ford Foundation.

Members
University of Illinois at Urbana–Champaign
Indiana University Bloomington
University of Iowa
University of Michigan
Michigan State University
University of Minnesota
Ohio State University
Pennsylvania State University
Purdue University
University of Wisconsin–Madison

References

External links
Official website
 Indiana University's Midwest Universities Consortium for International Activities records, 1952-1981, bulk 1955-1973

College and university associations and consortia in the United States